Fremantle District Cricket Club is a cricket club which competes in the Western Australian Grade Cricket competition, the highest level of club cricket in Western Australia.

History
Records of a cricket club known as Fremantle Cricket Club date back to at least the early 1880s when an annual cricket match was played between the Metropolitan Cricket Club (representing Perth) and Fremantle CC. The current club dates its history to 1886.

Home ground
The club plays its home fixtures at Stevens Reserve, Fremantle and shares the facilities with the Fremantle Hockey Club.

Records
Highest Score For:  9/587 v. Subiaco-Floreat 1978/79
Highest Score Against:  495 by Karrakatta 1897/98
Lowest Score For:  10 v. North Perth 1907/08
Lowest Score Against:  12 by I Zingari 1886/87
Highest aggregate in career: 6133 by Merv Inverarity
Highest aggregate in season: 834 by Phil O'Meara in 1978/79
Highest individual score: 208 by Mitchell Marsh v. Gosnells Cricket Club, Sutherland Park 2008/09

References

External links
Official club website

Cricket clubs established in 1886
Sport in Fremantle
Western Australian Grade Cricket clubs
1886 establishments in Australia
Sporting clubs in Perth, Western Australia